Michael Holmes is a former leader of the UK Independence Party (UKIP), who served as a Member of the European Parliament (MEP) for South West England from 1999 to 2002. He was educated at Sevenoaks School.

At the 1997 general election, Holmes unsuccessfully contested the New Forest West constituency. Later that year he was elected leader of UKIP. In 1999 he and two other UKIP candidates were elected to the European Parliament. The following year, he stepped down from the leadership as a result of calling for extended powers for the European Parliament in his maiden speech there in defiance of party policy. The party conference condemned him.  He left the party, but continued to sit as an independent MEP until 2002. He then resigned as an MEP and was replaced by Graham Booth, who had been the next candidate on the UKIP party list for South West England.

References

Year of birth missing (living people)
Living people
People educated at Sevenoaks School
UK Independence Party parliamentary candidates
Leaders of the UK Independence Party
UK Independence Party MEPs
MEPs for England 1999–2004
British Eurosceptics